Jan Zbigniew Ossoliński (1555–1623) was a Polish–Lithuanian nobleman, or szlachcic.

He held the following offices:
Secretary to the King from 1578
Chamberlain or podkomorzy of Sandomierz from 1593
Castellan of Małogoszcz and Żarnów from 1603
Voivode of the Podlasie Voivodeship from 1605
Voivode of the Sandomierz Voivodeship from 1613
Elder or starost of Czersk, Nowe Miasto, and Stopnica.

Jan Zbigniew Ossoliński was the son of Hieronim Ossoliński, and the father of Jerzy Ossoliński, who was to become Kanclerz (Chancellor) of the Polish–Lithuanian Commonwealth.

Secular senators of the Polish–Lithuanian Commonwealth
1555 births
1623 deaths
Jan Zbiginiew